Rucker is an unincorporated community in the northwest corner of Boone County, Missouri, United States. The community is located at the intersection of Missouri routes T and F about 6.5 miles north of Harrisburg. The site lies between Perche Creek and Sugar Creek.

History
A post office called Rucker was established in 1889, and remained in operation until 1908.  The community was named for Maj. John F. Rucker.

References

Unincorporated communities in Boone County, Missouri
Unincorporated communities in Missouri